Igbaras, officially the Municipality of Igbaras, is a 3rd class municipality in the province of Iloilo, Philippines. According to the 2020 census, it has a population of 32,197 people.

Igbaras celebrates its town fiesta annually on May 22 in honor of Santa Rita de Cascia. The town has many points of interest including the ruins of the church belfry, Mount Napulak, Bahi-Bahi, Nadsadjan Falls, Lagsakan Falls, Timapok Falls, Guiritsan Falls, Sampanan Falls, Bat Cave, Igcabugao Cave, Bais Cave and the Pakuyang sa Tangyan Festival. A species of Rafflesia, the world's largest flower, can also be found here.

Etymology
The name Igbaras comes from a combination of two words, "ig" or "tig" which means "plenty of" or "season of", and "baras" which means "sand". Thus Igbaras means "plenty of sand" which alludes to the nearby sandy river. Igbaras is most commonly mistaken with the similar-sounding and more widely known province of Guimaras.

History 

As a result of the implementation of Spanish Governor-General Narciso Claveria's decree on giving Filipinos with Spanish surnames in 1849, inhabitants of Igbaras during that time were apportioned with surnames starting mostly with the letter E.

Igbaras was fused with Guimbal in 1902 until the American regime made it a separate town on January 1, 1919. Don Flor Evidente became the first municipal mayor.

American soldiers water tortured Igbaras leaders then burned the village to the ground during the Philippine–American War

Igbaras has the distinction of having the first congressman elected to Congress in 1925–1928 in the person of Don Eugenio Ealdama, and the delegate to the 1935 Constitutional Convention, Don Mariano Ezpeleta who later served as Consul-General and ambassador to several countries.

Geography
Igbaras is located at the south-western part of Iloilo. It is situated between the coordinates of 122.2650’ longitude, and 10.7167’ latitude.

Barangays
Igbaras is politically subdivided into 46 barangays.  Alameda was formerly known as Bukaw.

Climate

Demographics

People from Igbaras speak Kinaray-a, a language associated with Antique province. However, Hiligaynon, a vernacular commonly used in Iloilo City is understood by everyone and used mostly by students or those staying in the city.

Economy

Education
Secondary:
 Igbaras National High School
 Igtalongon National High School
 Alameda National High School

Elementary and Primary:

Government
The Mayor is the chief executive of the town. He is elected to serve a three-year term, with a maximum of three terms. The incumbent Municipal Mayor is Atty. Vicente E. Escorpion Jr. The Vice Mayor is the Presiding Officer of the Sangguniang Bayan. He is also the chief executive of the town whenever the mayor is out of the town. He is elected to serve a three-year term, with a maximum of three terms. The incumbent vice mayor is Atty. Sherwin Paul E. Quidato. The Sangguniang Bayan of Igbaras is composed of 8 members with 2 ex-officio members which are the town's Liga ng mga Barangay President and Sangguniang Kabataan Federation President. The municipal councilors are elected to serve a three-year term, with a maximum of three terms.

The town officials from June 30, 2022, to June 30, 2025. They were elected last May 9, 2022 Philippine General Elections

List of former chief executive
Don Flor Evidente (1919–1922)
Lucas Gentica (1922–1925)
Julian Bucoy Saavedra (1925–1931)
Justo Estrella (1931–1938)
Gerardo Escala (1938–1941)
Toribio Melliza (1941–1945, 1961–1964)
Perfecto Saavedra (1945–1955)
Ricardo Ealdama (1955–1961)
Atty. Daniel Esmeralda (1964–1977)
Vicente E. Perez (1977–1985)
Wilfredo C. Uy (1986–1992)
Fruto J. Saavedra (1992–2001)
Jaime Esmeralda, MD (2001–2010)
Atty. Vicente E. Escorpion Jr. (2010–2019)
Jaime Esmeralda, MD (2019–2022)
Atty. Vicente E. Escorpion Jr. (2022–Present)

References

External links
 Igbaras Website 
 [ Philippine Standard Geographic Code]
 Philippine Census Information
 Local Governance Performance Management System 

Municipalities of Iloilo